CCIR is a four-letter abbreviation that may stand for:

California Coalition for Immigration Reform, a California political advocacy group for immigration reduction
Campaign for Comprehensive Immigration Reform, a Washington, DC organization for immigrant rights
Canadian Centre for Investigative Reporting, produces thoroughly researched reporting in the public interest
 Centre for Counseling Innovation and Research (CCIR), at Kish Island, Tehran, Mashhad
Comité Consultatif International pour la Radio, a forerunner of the ITU-R
CCIR 601, the former name of a broadcasting standard promulgated by the CCIR
CCIR-tones, A selective calling system used in some radio communications systems in some European countries
CCIR-1k and CCIR-2k, noise weighting standards for audio signals
 Commander's critical information requirement, a term in the US military